The minister of state for security is a senior ministerial position in the government of the United Kingdom, falling under the Home Office. The post was created by then-Prime Minister Gordon Brown on 3 June 2009 by splitting the now-defunct post of the minister for security, counter-terrorism, crime and policing between this post (then called Minister for Security and Counter-Terrorism) and the new post of Minister for Crime and Policing.

The current incumbent is Tom Tugendhat, appointed by Liz Truss in 2022. He previously served as Chair of the Foreign Affairs Select Committee from 2017 to 2022. Tugendhat continued in his post under the Sunak ministry that succeeded the short-lived Truss ministry. 

In a cabinet reshuffle on 15 September 2021, the ministerial title changed to Minister of State for Security and Borders. 

The post is generally seen as one of the most senior Minister of State positions, and as such its holder is often invited to attend cabinet meetings.

Ministers

Notes

References

Defunct ministerial offices in the United Kingdom
2009 establishments in the United Kingdom
2014 disestablishments in the United Kingdom